Herbert L. Cohen was an American politician and lawyer.

Cohen was a native of Bridgeport, Connecticut. After graduating from Yale College and Yale Law School, he began practicing law in 1928, founding the firm Cohen & Wolf. Between 1933 and 1937, Cohen served on the Connecticut General Assembly. He served on several arts and cultural organizations, including the Fairfield County Symphony Society, the Friends of Music Inc., and the Connecticut Commission on the Arts, and was a trustee of several others, among them the University of Bridgeport and American Shakespeare Theatre. Cohen  was director of the United Nations Association of the United States of America, and a founder of the University of Bridgeport Law School. In later life, Cohnen moved to Westport. He died in September 1983, while visiting London.

Herbert Cohen was married to the pianist Ruth Steinkraus Cohen, who died in 2002.

References

1983 deaths
1900s births
20th-century American politicians
20th-century American lawyers
Politicians from Bridgeport, Connecticut
Connecticut lawyers
Members of the Connecticut General Assembly
Yale College alumni
Yale Law School alumni